Adam Russel (fl. 1295) was an English politician. He was a Member of the Parliament of England for Preston in 1295.  He and Willielmus fil' (filius) Pauli were the first recorded members of Parliament for this constituency.

References

English MPs 1295
Year of birth missing
Year of death missing